Suelette Dreyfus is a technology researcher, journalist, and writer. Her fields of research include information systems, digital security and privacy, the impact of technology on whistleblowing, health informatics and e-education. Her work examines digital whistleblowing as a form of freedom of expression and the right of dissent from corruption. She is a researcher and lecturer in the Department of Computing and Information Systems at the University of Melbourne, as well as the principal researcher on an international research project on the impact of digital technologies on whistleblowing.

Career
Dreyfus' work in e-health has focused on the patient information experience in the health system and the role of technology in error incident reporting in hospital settings. She has co-invented prototypes in information design for pathology reports with the aim of allowing doctors to improve communication with patients and families regarding the status of their diseases in progressive and chronic illnesses such as diabetes.

Her research in e-education has focused on using social media to teach foreign language to English-speaking primary school students, particularly for difficult languages that require more hours of practice such as Asian languages.

Dreyfus has written on the importance of protecting Freedom of Information access (FOI), the problems of information asymmetry and "tool asymmetry" between the individual citizen and the state, and the trend of "security clearance creep".

Underground

She is the author of the 1997 book Underground: Hacking, Madness and Obsession on the Electronic Frontier. The book describes the exploits of a group of Australian, American, and British hackers during the late 1980s and early 1990s, among them Julian Assange who is credited as a researcher for the book.

Dreyfus released it in e-version in 2001 for free. She also donated the e-book to Project Gutenberg’s library so it would be available in perpetuity to the public, in various text formats, for free, partly so that the book would be easily accessible by the vision-impaired.

Dreyfus was an Associate Producer and interview subject for the documentary In the Realm of the Hackers, inspired by Underground, in 2003.

Journalism
She has been a contributor to The Sydney Morning Herald, The Australian, The Independent, and The Age, as well as to radio programs including the Australian Broadcasting Corporation's Late Night Live with Philip Adams. She trained and worked as a staff reporter for a daily newspaper in Australia.

In 2015 and 2016, Dreyfus has run training for journalists in a major media organisation and in a journalism school on digital and physical methods of protecting sources and data. She also runs information security workshops for journalism students in the University of Melbourne with Andrew Clausen and Yung Ju Chua.

Her essays have also appeared in The Conversation, discussing the importance of protecting public access to strong encryption, the need for legal protections for whistleblowers, and the security paradox of legislation enforcing retention of metadata for two years for everyone in Australia.

References

External links
Underground: Hacking, Madness and Obsession on the Electronic Frontier

Living people
Academic staff of the University of Melbourne
Australian people of French-Jewish descent
Writers about computer security
Cypherpunks
Activists from Melbourne
Australian women writers
Australian computer specialists
Australian freelance journalists
Australian political journalists
Australian producers
Internet activists
Journalists from Melbourne
Open content activists
Year of birth missing (living people)
Information systems researchers